Jutta Seppinen  (born 1976) is a Finnish conductor and mezzo-soprano.

Life and career

Early life
Seppinen was born in Helsinki in 1976. She spent part of her early childhood in Paris. She began her musical studies at the age of seven, playing the violin at a Helsinki music school. At around the same time, she began singing in a choir, which became an important childhood hobby. She switched instruments to the piano at the age of 14, and some time later took up singing as her main instrument.

Education
Her thesis, written in 2005, analyses the interpretation of Desdemona in the operas Otello by Verdi and Otello by Rossini. She received her Diploma in classical singing with excellent grades in 2007 and graduated as Master of Music in 2008.

After some years with a career as a choral conductor and singer, Seppinen returned to the Sibelius Academy in 2011 for a second master's degree, studying orchestral conducting with Professor Leif Segerstam and Professor Atso Almila. Other conducting teachers have included Esa-Pekka Salonen, Osmo Vänskä, Jorma Panula, Mikko Franck, John Storgårds, and Herbert Blomstedt. She spent the spring semester of 2013 at the University of Music and Theatre Leipzig, studying orchestral conducting with Professor Ulrich Windfuhr.

In 2014, Seppinen was selected for the Finnish National Opera's  programme for Sibelius Academy conducting students, being mentored in opera production and conducting by chief conductor Michael Güttler.

Seppinen's long-time private vocal teacher is Finnish opera singer and mezzo-soprano .

Professional career
For a brief period in 2003, succeeding Mia Makaroff, Seppinen directed the Helsinki-based female voice choir . She was succeeded by Michaela Ijäs . From 2004 to 2005, she directed the girls' choir . She was succeeded by Nina Kronlund.

In 2005, Seppinen was appointed artistic director of the Helsinki-based academic mixed voice choir , also known as WiOL. She stepped down in 2011, having directed the choir for six years.

In 2009, having received her first MMus degree a year prior, Seppinen was appointed artistic director of the Academic Female Voice Choir Lyran, the only female voice choir affiliated with the University of Helsinki, succeeding Kari Turunen. Under her leadership, the choir has expanded its stylistic width and its repertoire into new genres.

In 2014, Seppinen conducted the Sibelius Academy's production of the opera Così fan tutte by Wolfgang Amadeus Mozart, and in 2015 she conducted the Academic Female Voice Choir Lyran's, the Academic Male Voice Choir of Helsinki's, and the  production of the Mass in B minor by Johann Sebastian Bach.

As a mezzo-soprano, Seppinen has given solo concerts, been part of opera productions, and performed in contemporary music festivals, both in Finland and abroad.

Accolades
In 2002, Seppinen finished second in the VocalEspoo (previously known as ) choral conducting competition. In 2006, she was selected for the international  competition for young choral conductors.

Conducting the Academic Female Voice Choir Lyran at the 30th Praga Cantat International Choir Competition in Prague in October 2016, Seppinen received the Miroslav Košler Special Prize for outstanding conducting performance.

Personal life
Seppinen lives in Helsinki with her family.

References

External links

 Official website
 The Academic Female Voice Choir Lyran

Living people
1976 births
Finnish conductors (music)
Finnish mezzo-sopranos
21st-century Finnish women singers
21st-century conductors (music)